Russell Allan Higgins  is a former senior Australian public servant and policymaker.

Life and career

Higgins was appointed Secretary of the Department of Industry, Science and Tourism on 27 January 1997. After the department was abolished in 1998, Higgins was appointed Secretary of the new Department of Industry, Science and Resources.

In 2006, Higgins was appointed to the Prime Ministerial Task Group on Emissions Trading.

Higgins was appointed Chair of the Board of the Global CCS Institute in June 2009.

In June 2013, Higgins was appointed to the board of Leighton Holdings. He resigned from the board in May 2014.

Awards
In 2001, Higgins was awarded the Centenary Medal in recognition of his outstanding service to government.

Higgins was made an Officer of the Order of Australia in January 2006 for service to the community through the development and implementation of a broad range of government policies including financial management and accountability, microeconomic reform, and science and innovation strategies.

References

Living people
Year of birth missing (living people)
Australian public servants
Officers of the Order of Australia
Recipients of the Centenary Medal